Llanbabo (meaning: Church of Pabo) is a small village two miles north west of Llannerch-y-medd in Anglesey, Wales. It lies within the community of Tref Alaw.

The ancient church of St Pabo, Llanbabo is dedicated to Saint Pabo: possibly Pabo Post Prydain, one of the leaders among the Britons of the Hen Ogledd following the withdrawal of the Roman legions. He is said to have founded a church here in 460, upon the site of which the present one is built, and to have been buried here along with his daughters. A 14th-century effigy of Pabo, along with the words HIC JACET PABO POST PRUD CORPORS ... TE ... PRIMA, is found on a stone in the church.

Llyn Alaw lies nearby.

Notes

Villages in Anglesey
Tref Alaw